Aanmai Thavarael (Missing Masculinity) is a 2011 Tamil-language crime thriller film written and directed by Kuzhanthai Velappan. The film, featuring newcomers Dhruva and Shruti alongside Sampath Raj and Panchu Subbu in primary roles, deals with human trafficking. It was released on 3 June 2011.

Cast

 Dhruva as Vettri
 Shruti as Yamuna
 Sampath Raj as Charles Antony
 Panchu Subbu as Mr. A
 John Vijay as 'Andhra' Prasad
 Annie Gill as Kerala girl 
 Tharun Kshatriya as Pavan 
 Lakshmi Ramakrishnan as Mary
 Deepika Kamaiah
 Chitra Lakshmanan as Vetri's boss
 Lollu Sabha Jeeva as Vetri's friend
 Crane Manohar as Cab Driver
 Swaminathan as Swaminathan
 Manobala
 Uma Padmanabhan
 Dharan as a pimp
 Nandha Saravanan as a cop

Soundtrack 
Soundtrack was composed by Mariya Manohar.
"Nona Nona" - Dev, Krithika
"Kadhal Adaimazhai" - Krish, Ramya
"Vazhiyil Thulaindhu" - Padmalatha
"Satta Sada" - Karthikeyan, Naveen, Venkath Renganathan

Reception
Behindwoods wrote "At first, congrats to the team for coming up with such a bold subject. The standard of execution of the plot in AT puts the film at a higher level. The director has a clear focus, to show the way in which crime and police operate, and he succeeds in most parts". News18 wrote "Debutant writer-director Kulanthai Velappan has his script focused, and moves his narration at a steady pace, the interest rarely waning". Nowrunning wrote "Aanmai Thavarael is an overlong, over scored vapid lackluster that has nothing to do with you once you're out of the theatre".

References

External links
 

Indian crime thriller films
2011 crime thriller films
Films about prostitution in India
Films about kidnapping in India
Films about human trafficking in India
2011 films
2010s Tamil-language films